Charles Sydney Graham (26 August 1868 –  8 September 1943) was a rugby union player who represented Australia.

Graham, a hooker, was born in Castlereagh New South Wales and claimed one international rugby cap for Australia. His debut game was against Great Britain, at Brisbane, on 22 July 1899.

References

Australian rugby union players
Australia international rugby union players
1868 births
1943 deaths
Rugby union players from Sydney
Rugby union hookers